Dance with the Dead is a music duo from California formed in 2013 by Justin Pointer and Tony Kim with a musical style blending metal and synthwave.

Biography 
Dance with the Dead was formed by two friends Justin Pointer and Tony Kim in 2013. The two are originally from Anaheim, USA, where they had been childhood friends. Over the years they have shifted towards Justin playing the synths while Tony plays electric guitar, although the two may play either while on stage or recording. The band name "Dance with the Dead" originates from a working title for their first song and their fandom to the horror movie genre.

The largest influences with the themes of Dance with the Dead have been horror movies, and their songs typically originate from jamming and passing around riffs and samples. They have mentioned musical and thematic influence by directors and composers such as Dario Argento, John Carpenter and Hans Zimmer. 

The duo has emphasized energetic live performances with guitars and synths. They have been prolific on touring with the album releases, with world-wide The Shape tour in 2017, Loved to Death tour in 2018, and Driven to Madness tour in 2022. During their live performances, they have shared venues with artists such as Carpenter Brut, Dragonforce, The Devin Townsend Project, Magic Sword, and Daniel Deluxe. During tours, they have performed with the on-tour drummer John Terry.

While they had previously self-released their music via digital distribution, the album Loved to Death in 2018 was the first to be released with Neuropa Records.

Dance with the Dead were featured in the 2019 documentary The Rise of the Synths exploring the rising popularity of the synthwave music genre, both in the documentary as well as in the movie's soundtrack with the song Dead of Night.

Their record and merchandise art have had a distinct style noted in interviews, with most of the work done by graphical artists Ruben Martinez and Mark Kosobucki.

Discography 
Adapted from Bandcamp, Spotify, and YouTube

Albums 

 Out of Body (October 2013, self-released)
 Near Dark (August 2014, self-released)
 Send the Signal (December 2014, self-released)
 The Shape (February 2016, self-released)
 B-Sides: Vol. 1 (January 2017, self-released)
 Loved to Death (August 2018, Neuropa Records)
 Driven to Madness (January 2022, Neuropa Records)

Singles 

 The Poison (Reprise) (September 2015)
 Tension (February 2019)

EPs 

 Blackout (January 2020)

Remixes 

 Assault on Precinct 13 (theme) (January 2013), by John Carpenter
 Master of Puppets (May 2015), by Metallica
 Doubt (July 2015), by Good Knives
 Gremlins (theme) (December 2015)
 Paint It Black (March 2016), by The Rolling Stones
 Around the World (July 2016), by Daft Punk
 We Will Rock You (September 2016), by Queen
 Neo-Tokyo (March 2017), by Scandroid
 Kickstart My Heart (September 2017), by Mötley Crüe
 Unspoken (June 2020), by The Dead Daisies
 Takes All Night (July 2020), by LeBrock
 Holy Ground (January 2021), by The Dead Daisies

Music videos 

 Sledge (December 2021)
 Hex (March 2022)

References 

Year of birth missing (living people)
Living people